Amagá is a town and municipality in Antioquia Department, Colombia. It is part of the subregion of Southwestern Antioquia. The area was known for its coal and iron ore production and it hosted early iron works. Ex-Colombian president Belisario Betancur was born at this location.

Notable places
The Forge (La Ferrería) produced the first steel in Antioquia and operated from 1864 to 1931.  Its ruins are now a Rural National Monument.

Climate

Notes
There is also a very famous touristic place which is called "El viaducto"(the path).

External links

 Amaga official website

  

Municipalities of Antioquia Department